Mesiano is an Italian surname. Notable people with the surname include:
Alessia Mesiano (born 1991), Italian boxer
José Mesiano (born 1942), Argentine footballer

Italian-language surnames